David Loiseau (born December 17, 1979) is a Canadian former mixed martial artist from Montreal, Quebec. He has fought in the Ultimate Fighting Championship, EliteXC, and TKO Major League MMA veteran. He is the former TKO World Middleweight Champion and former two-time TKO Canadian Middleweight Champion. He was also a former TPF Middleweight Champion. He was the first French-speaking Canadian to fight in the Ultimate Fighting Championship. Loiseau has also played a gang member in French-Canadian movie La rage de l'ange. Loiseau wrote and acted in a short film called Keelos, featuring hip-hop artist Imposs and Stand-up comedian Eddy King.

Biography
David Loiseau was born in Montreal, Quebec, Canada to Haitian parents. He had expressed his concern for the people of Haiti and for his grandparents who were still residing in Haiti at the time of the earthquake of 2010. He has urged people to donate and to help the country as much as they can. "I don't want to sleep," he said.  "I want to get the message out."

MMA career

UCC
Loiseau began his MMA career fighting for the Canadian-based Universal Combat Challenge (UCC) (later sold and renamed TKO Major League MMA.) He earned a record of 8-2, including wins over Shawn Tompkins, Joe Doerksen and Tony Fryklund.

Ultimate Fighting Championship
Loiseau made his UFC debut in April 2003 at UFC 42, defeating Mark Weir by KO. Later in the year, at UFC 44, he lost a unanimous decision to Jorge Rivera.

After going 2-1 in the TKO promotion, Loiseau returned to the UFC in 2005 with TKO wins of Gideon Ray, Charles McCarthy and Evan Tanner. He then lost back-to-back unanimous decisions in 2006, to Rich Franklin at UFC 58 and to Mike Swick at UFC 63.

In 2009, after going 4-2 in smaller promotions, Loiseau returned again, losing another unanimous decision to Ed Herman at UFC 97. He was subsequently released from the UFC.

After a TKO win over Chester Post at 	MFL 2 - Battleground, Loiseau returned to the UFC and lost to Mario Miranda via TKO on June 12, 2010, at UFC 115. He was again released from the UFC following this loss.

Independent Promotions
In his first fight after his last UFC release, Loiseau defeated Leopoldo Serao at Tachi Palace Fights 8: All or Nothing for the TPF Middleweight Championship via TKO in the fifth round, when the doctor declared Serao too badly cut to continue.

Loiseau was expected to defend the title at TPF 10 on Aug 5, against Givanildo Santana. But on July 28, 2011, Loiseau's agent announced he had sustained an injury which would require surgery, and would not be able to fight. Loiseau later revealed in an interview with KORE Vision that he underwent two surgeries, one in September and the other in November 2011, for an inside and outside meniscus repair in his left elbow.

Loiseau made his return to the cage to defeat Christopher McNally by TKO at the CES event Real Pain on October 6, 2012, at the Dunkin’ Donuts Center in Providence, Rhode Island.

Loiseau was scheduled to fight in Calgary on July 12, 2013 against Marcus Vinicius for Aggression Fighting Championship 20, but the Calgary commission did not allow that fight. He instead fought in Montreal at Challenge MMA 2 on August 17, taking a unanimous decision from Caleb Grummet.

Loiseau was scheduled to fight Mike Kent on October 25, in the main event of ECC 18 in Halifax, Nova Scotia.  Loiseau won the ECC Light-Heavyweight title with a quick TKO over Kent.

Loiseau faced Dwayne Lewis on June 7, 2014 in the main event at WSOF Canada 2. Loiseau lost via unanimous decision.

Filmography
Loiseau was co-featured in a mixed martial arts documentary The Striking Truth (2010) alongside Georges St-Pierre.

In 2012, Loiseau was the main character in a reality TV show Crowtime, focusing on following Loiseau around the world searching for training.

Personal life
After his retirement from MMA, Loiseau has been running his own professional MMA gym Crow training center in his native Montreal. Alongside his own business, Loiseau also teaches at Montreal Wrestling Club and Jorge Santiago's Xcell Jiu-Jitsu in Florida.

Championships and accomplishments
Extreme Cage Combat
ECC Light Heavyweight Championship (One time, current)
Tachi Palace Fights
TPF Middleweight Championship (One time)
TKO Major League MMA/UCC
TKO World Middleweight Championship (One time)
TKO Canadian Middleweight Championship (Two time)
Brazilian Jiu Jitsu
Awarded black belt in Brazilian Jiu Jitsu on May 17, 2017 by Jorge Santiago

Mixed martial arts record

|-
| Loss
| align=center| 23–11
| Dwayne Lewis
| Decision (unanimous)
| WSOF Canada 2
| 
| align=center| 3
| align=center| 5:00
| Edmonton, Alberta, Canada
|
|-
| Win
| align=center| 23–10
| Mike Kent
| TKO (punches)
| ECC 18 - Road to Glory
| 
| align=center| 1
| align=center| 0:15
| Halifax, Nova Scotia, Canada
| 	
|-
| Win
| align=center| 22–10
| Caleb Grummet
| Decision (unanimous)
| Challenge MMA 2
| 
| align=center| 3
| align=center| 5:00
| Montreal, Quebec, Canada
| 		
|-
| Win
| align=center| 21–10
| Christopher McNally
| TKO (doctor stoppage)
| CES 12: Real Pain
| 
| align=center| 1
| align=center| 2:30
| Providence, Rhode Island, United States
|
|-
| Win
| align=center| 20–10
| Leopoldo Serao
| TKO (doctor stoppage)
| TPF 8: All or Nothing
| 
| align=center| 5
| align=center| 1:12
| Lemoore, California, United States
| 
|-
| Loss
| align=center| 19–10
| Mario Miranda
| TKO (punches)
| UFC 115
| 
| align=center| 2
| align=center| 4:07
| Vancouver, British Columbia, Canada
|
|-
| Win
| align=center| 19–9
| Chester Post
| TKO (punches)
| MFL 2 Battleground
| 
| align=center| 1
| align=center| 4:40
| Montreal, Quebec, Canada
|
|-
| Loss
| align=center| 18–9
| Ed Herman
| Decision (unanimous)
| UFC 97
| 
| align=center| 3
| align=center| 5:00
| Montreal, Quebec, Canada
|
|-
| Win
| align=center| 18–8
| Solomon Hutcherson
| TKO (knees)
| Xtreme MMA 5: It's Crow Time
| 
| align=center| 5
| align=center| 1:56
| Montreal, Quebec, Canada
|
|-
| Win
| align=center| 17–8
| Andrew Buckland
| KO (punches)
| Legacy FC: Resurrection
| 
| align=center| 1
| align=center| 0:20
| Calgary, Alberta, Canada
|
|-
| Win
| align=center| 16–8
| Todd Gouwenberg
| Decision (unanimous)
| HCF: Crow's Nest
| 
| align=center| 3
| align=center| 5:00
| Gatineau, Quebec, Canada
|
|-
| Loss
| align=center| 15–8
| Jason Day
| Decision (split)
| HCF: Destiny
| 
| align=center| 3
| align=center| 5:00
| Calgary, Alberta, Canada
|
|-
| Win
| align=center| 15–7
| Freddie Espiricueta
| Submission (arm-triangle choke)
| Art of War 2
| 
| align=center| 2
| align=center| 3:10
| Austin, Texas, United States
|
|-
| Loss
| align=center| 14–7
| Joey Villaseñor
| Decision (unanimous)
| EliteXC Destiny
| 
| align=center| 3
| align=center| 5:00
| Southaven, Mississippi, United States
|
|-
| Loss
| align=center| 14–6
| Mike Swick
| Decision (unanimous)
| UFC 63: Hughes vs. Penn
| 
| align=center| 3
| align=center| 5:00
| Anaheim, California, United States
|
|-
| Loss
| align=center| 14–5
| Rich Franklin
| Decision (unanimous)
| UFC 58: USA vs. Canada
| 
| align=center| 5
| align=center| 5:00
| Las Vegas, Nevada, United States
| 
|-
| Win
| align=center| 14–4
| Evan Tanner
| TKO (doctor stoppage)
| UFC Ultimate Fight Night 2
| 
| align=center| 2
| align=center| 4:15
| Las Vegas, Nevada, United States
| 
|-
| Win
| align=center| 13–4
| Charles McCarthy
| TKO (spinning back kick)
| UFC 53
| 
| align=center| 2
| align=center| 2:10
| Atlantic City, New Jersey, United States
|
|-
| Win
| align=center| 12–4
| Gideon Ray
| TKO (doctor stoppage)
| UFC 51
| 
| align=center| 1
| align=center| 5:00
| Las Vegas, Nevada, United States
|
|-
| Win
| align=center| 11–4
| Curtis Stout
| Decision (unanimous)
| TKO 17: Revenge
| 
| align=center| 3
| align=center| 5:00
| Victoriaville, Quebec, Canada
|
|-
| Win
| align=center| 10–4
| Chris Fontaine
| KO (punch)
| TKO 16: Infernal
| 
| align=center| 1
| align=center| 0:13
| Quebec City, Quebec, Canada
| 
|-
| Loss
| align=center| 9–4
| Jeremy Horn
| Submission (guillotine choke)
| TKO 15: Unstoppable
| 
| align=center| 1
| align=center| 0:54
| Montreal, Quebec, Canada
| 
|-
| Loss
| align=center| 9–3
| Jorge Rivera
| Decision (unanimous)
| UFC 44
| 
| align=center| 3
| align=center| 5:00
| Las Vegas, Nevada, United States
|
|-
| Win
| align=center| 9–2
| Mark Weir
| KO (punches)
| UFC 42
| 
| align=center| 1
| align=center| 3:55
| Miami, Florida, United States
|
|-
| Win
| align=center| 8–2
| Tony Fryklund
| TKO (doctor stoppage)
| UCC 12: Adrenaline
| 
| align=center| 1
| align=center| 4:24
| Montreal, Quebec, Canada
| 
|-
| Win
| align=center| 7–2
| Jesse Jones
| Decision (unanimous)
| UCC 11: The Next Level
| 
| align=center| 3
| align=center| 5:00
| Montreal, Quebec, Canada
| 
|-
| Win
| align=center| 6–2
| Claudionor Fontinelle
| TKO (punches)
| UCC 8: Fast and Furious
| 
| align=center| 2
| align=center| 0:56
| Rimouski, Quebec, Canada
|
|-
| Win
| align=center| 5–2
| Joe Doerksen
| Decision (unanimous)
| UCC 7: Bad Boyz
| 
| align=center| 3
| align=center| 5:00
| Montreal, Quebec, Canada
|
|-
| Win
| align=center| 4–2
| Anis Abdelli
| Submission (rear-naked choke)
| UCC 6: Redemption
| 
| align=center| 1
| align=center| 1:41
| Montreal, Quebec, Canada
|
|-
| Win
| align=center| 3–2
| Shawn Tompkins
| TKO (punches)
| UCC 4: Return Of The Super Strikers
| 
| align=center| 1
| align=center| 1:26
| Sherbrooke, Quebec, Canada
|
|-
| Loss
| align=center| 2–2
| Jason St. Louis
| TKO (punches)
| UCC 3: Battle for the Belts
| 
| align=center| 1
| align=center| 2:42
| Sherbrooke, Quebec, Canada
| 
|-
| Win
| align=center| 2–1
| Steve Vigneault
| TKO (corner stoppage)
| TKO Major League 2: Moment of Truth
| 
| align=center| 1
| align=center| 10:00
| Montreal, Quebec, Canada
| 
|-
| Win
| align=center| 1–1
| Justin Bruckmann
| Submission (guillotine choke)
| TKO Major League 2: Moment of Truth
| 
| align=center| 1
| align=center| 3:07
| Montreal, Quebec, Canada
| 
|-
| Loss
| align=center| 0–1
| Justin Bruckmann
| Submission (armbar)
| TKO Major League 1: The New Beginning
| 
| align=center| 1
| align=center| 3:04
| Montreal, Quebec, Canada
|

References

External links
 
 
 TRISTAR GYM - Popular training facility for Montréal-based MMA fighters.
 Crowmma.com David 'The Crow' Loiseau The Official Website
 UltimeFanatic.com All news and interviews concerning David Loiseau from the French Canadian website UltimeFanatic.com

1979 births
Black Canadian mixed martial artists
Canadian male mixed martial artists
Canadian male taekwondo practitioners
Canadian practitioners of Brazilian jiu-jitsu
People awarded a black belt in Brazilian jiu-jitsu
Haitian Quebecers
Living people
Middleweight mixed martial artists
Mixed martial artists utilizing taekwondo
Mixed martial artists utilizing Brazilian jiu-jitsu
Sportspeople from Montreal
Ultimate Fighting Championship male fighters